Somerville High School may refer to:

Somerville High School (Massachusetts) in Somerville, Massachusetts
Somerville High School (New Jersey) in Somerville, New Jersey
Somerville High School (Texas) in the Somerville Independent School District of Somerville, Texas